The 2017 Green Bay Packers season was the franchise 's 99th season overall, 97th season in the National Football League, and the 12th under head coach Mike McCarthy. After reaching the NFC Championship Game in the previous season, the team attempted to improve on their 10–6 record from 2016. However, the team was eliminated from postseason contention after Week 15, marking the first time since 2008 that they failed to qualify for the playoffs.

The Packers started out strong, compiling a 4–1 record, but during a week 6 game against their division rival Minnesota Vikings, the Packers lost starting quarterback Aaron Rodgers to a collarbone injury and eventually ended with a 7-9 record despite his attempted return in a loss to Carolina in Week 15. A blowout 35–11 loss to the Lions in week 17 secured the Packers’ first losing season since 2008.

Player movements

Free agents

Trades

Signings

Subtractions

Draft

Notes
 The Packers received one compensatory selection – No. 182 overall.
Trades
Green Bay traded their first-round selection (29th) to Cleveland in exchange for Cleveland's second- and fourth-round selections (33rd and 108th).
Green Bay traded their fifth-round selection (172nd) to Denver in exchange for Denver's fifth- and seventh-round selections (175th and 238th).

Staff

Final roster

Starters

Offense

Defense

Preseason
The Packers' preliminary preseason schedule was announced on April 10.

Regular season

Schedule
The Packers' preliminary regular season schedule was announced on April 20.

Note: Intra-division opponents are in bold text.

Game summaries

Week 1: vs. Seattle Seahawks

The Packers' offense struggled for the first half against the Seahawks. On the Packers' first drive, Aaron Rodgers threw an interception that was returned for a touchdown, but an illegal block in the back penalty negated the score. Before that play Rodgers had gone his previous 251 regular season pass attempts without an interception, a career high. The Packers' defense held Seattle in check but trailed 3–0 at halftime. In the third quarter, Mike Daniels forced a fumble that Green Bay recovered at the Seattle 6-yard line, and Ty Montgomery ran in for a touchdown on the following play, giving the Packers a lead they wouldn't relinquish after that. Later Rodgers caught the Seahawks with 12 men on the field and capitalized on the free play by throwing a 32-yard touchdown to Jordy Nelson. The Packers only surrendered two field goals to Seattle for the rest of the game, giving a strong defensive showing in the season opener.

Week 2: at Atlanta Falcons

In a rematch of the 2017 NFC Championship game earlier that year, the Falcons defeated the Packers to open up their new stadium. The teams exchanged opening drive touchdowns, but with both starting tackles out of the game due to injury, the Packers' offense failed to keep pace. At the end of the first half, with the score 17–7, a 36-yard pass to Randall Cobb was called back due to a controversial Offensive Pass Interference call on tight end Martellus Bennet. On the ensuing play Aaron Rodgers threw an interception to Desmond Trufant that lead to a Falcons touchdown, making the score 24–7 at halftime. Aaron Rodgers fumbled on the Packers' first drive of the second half, leading to another Falcons' touchdown. Though the Packers would score two touchdowns in the fourth quarter, the Falcons still prevailed, 34–23. On a one-yard pass to Ty Montgomery late in the fourth quarter, Aaron Rodgers recorded his 300th career touchdown. He is the fastest quarterback in NFL history to reach the milestone, needing only 4,742 attempts.

Week 3: vs. Cincinnati Bengals

Although the Bengals entered the game 0–2 without scoring an offensive touchdown, the Packers fell behind early once again, 21–7, with one of the Bengal scores being an interception of Aaron Rodgers returned for the touchdown, which was only the second time in Rodgers career that he'd given up an interception for a touchdown. The Packers were able to rally back, tying the game with 21 seconds left in the game on a pinpoint 3-yard touchdown pass from Rodgers to Jordy Nelson. After forcing Cincinnati to punt on the opening drive in overtime, the Packers found themselves in a 3rd and 10 situation but Aaron Rodgers managed to draw the Bengals offsides, allowing for a free play that resulted in a Geronimo Allison 72-yard catch to the Cincinnati 8-yard line. Mason Crosby then kicked the winning field goal, giving Aaron Rodgers his first ever overtime win, after having gone 0–7 for his career in overtime games, which included the playoffs. This also gave Rodgers his first win over the Bengals, giving him a win over every NFL team but the Packers (including the playoffs).

Week 4: vs. Chicago Bears

In the 195th meeting between the Packers and Bears, the Packers took advantage early, scoring first on their opening drive, then scoring less than a minute later after recovering a Bear fumble. Taking advantage of several Chicago miscues, including three turnovers and a missed field goal, the Packers rolled to a convincing win over their rivals, with Aaron Rodgers throwing four touchdown passes. The victory also gave the Packers a 95–94–6 edge in the rivalry with the Bears, the first time the Packers had the lead in the rivalry since 1933. In the third quarter wide receiver Davante Adams took a vicious and illegal hit from Bears linebacker Danny Trevathan that required a stretcher to take Adams off the field. Adams was diagnosed with a concussion and immediately taken to the hospital, where he spent the night. He did not have any significant nerve damage and would return for next Sunday's game against the Dallas Cowboys.

Week 5: at Dallas Cowboys

In a rematch of the Divisional playoff game from the previous season, the Cowboys took an early 21–6 lead over the Packers, before the Packers rallied to pull themselves within six points at the end of the third quarter. In the fourth quarter, the lead changed hands four times, with the Packers getting the last push. With just over a minute left, Aaron Rodgers led a drive that was capped off by a 12-yard touchdown pass to Davante Adams with eleven seconds left in the game, giving the Packers their third win in a row. Rookie running back Aaron Jones also had his first 100-yard game of his NFL game, as well as the first for any running back on the Packers for the season.

Week 6: at Minnesota Vikings

The Packers lost Aaron Rodgers to a shoulder injury early in the game after he took a big hit from Minnesota linebacker Anthony Barr. It was later revealed that he suffered a broken right collarbone and the injury could end his 2017 season. Brett Hundley threw one touchdown, but also threw three costly interceptions, in relief of Rodgers as the Packers took a 23–10 loss. After the game, Mike McCarthy announced that due to Rodgers' injury, Hundley will be given the starting quarterback position "indefinitely."

Week 7: vs. New Orleans Saints

In his first career start, Brett Hundley took a conservative approach and completed 12 of 25 passes for only 87 yards, adding an interception without any passing touchdowns. Rookie Aaron Jones rushed for 131 yards on 17 carries and a touchdown, his second 100-yard game in three career starts. Two first half interceptions from Drew Brees helped the Packers maintain a 14–7 lead at halftime, but the Saints came out of the half scoring 9 points on their first two drives to take a 16–14 lead. After the two teams exchanged field goals, the Saints took the lead for good on an 8-play, 55 yard drive that ended with a 1-yard touchdown rush from Drew Brees. Green Bay's comeback effort was thwarted when Brett Hundley threw an interception to safety Kenny Vaccaro on the ensuing drive. The win marked the Saints' fourth consecutive victory after starting the season 0–2.

Week 8: Bye week
No game. Green Bay had a bye week.

Week 9: vs. Detroit Lions

Although the Packers came into the game off of a 15-day break, they played sloppily and lost to the Lions for only the second time at home since 1991. The Packers' solid opening drive was spoiled when kicker Mason Crosby's 38-yard attempt was blocked. The Lions scored touchdowns on two of their next three possessions as the Packers' Offense stalled with consecutive three and outs. Lions quarterback Matthew Stafford played an efficient game, registering two touchdowns with no interceptions, resulting in a 132.4 passer rating. In his second career start, Brett Hundley once again failed to attack the defense downfield or establish a comfortable pocket presence. He was sacked three times and failed to throw a passing touchdown for the second consecutive game.

Week 10: at Chicago Bears

Brett Hundley earned his first career win against rival Chicago Bears, finishing with one touchdown, no interceptions and a career high 110.8 passer rating. After failing to apply a solid pass rush in the previous two games, the Packers' Defense sacked Bears rookie Quarterback Mitchell Trubisky five times, with linebacker Nick Perry accounting for three. The Packers held Chicago's strong rushing attack to a mere 3.2 yards per carry. Packers' running backs Aaron Jones and Ty Montgomery left with knee and rib injuries, respectively, allowing rookie Jamaal Williams to see his first action in the NFL. Although only averaging 3.3 yards per rush, Williams ran well against a stout Chicago defensive front. In the second quarter, with Green Bay holding a 10–3 advantage, the Bears drove to Green Bay's 25-yard line and on third down and 13 Trubisky completed a short pass to running back Benny Cunningham that was first ruled down at the two yard line. Bears coach Jon Fox challenged the play, believing Cunningham reached the endzone, but upon review the officials determined that Cunningham lost the ball before stepping out of bounds, and in reaching for the pylon actually fumbled into the endzone. The resulting call was a touchback and Packers' ball at the 20-yard line. Although the Packers punted on the resulting possession, the reversal proved costly in a one score game.

Week 11: vs. Baltimore Ravens

The Packers wore their alternative throwback uniforms for this game.

For the first time in franchise history, the Packers lost to the Ravens at home. It was the second time in 11 years that the team was shut-out at home. After going the previous two games without a turnover, the Packers committed five: two fumbles and three interceptions. Brett Hundley threw three interceptions, including one in the end-zone on the team's opening drive, bringing his season interception total to seven, matching Rodgers' total from the entire 2016 regular season. Packers' rookie running back DeVante Mays fumbled on the first two carries of his career, losing one. Field position was key as the Ravens' special teams often kept the Packers starting drives deep in their own territory.

Week 12: at Pittsburgh Steelers

In one of the NFL's best games of 2017, Brett Hundley played his best game as a Packer. He threw two dimes to Cobb and Jamaal Williams for touchdowns. He would throw a third to Davante Adams on the opening drive of the second half. The Steelers and the Packers traded blows all game. Field position, which is something the Packers have struggled with in 2017, cost them the game. After a one-minute drive led to a punt, the Steelers drove 35 yards down the field in 17 seconds in the waning moments of the fourth quarter. Chris Boswell hit a career long 53-yard field goal as time expired. This would be the first of three straight game winning field goals for Boswell. The Steelers won the game 31–28.

Week 13: vs. Tampa Bay Buccaneers

The Packers had a 17–10 halftime lead, in large part to Lowry's defensive touchdown. Jameis Winston caught fire in the second half and gave the Buccaneers a 20–17 lead. Despite Brett Hundley only having 54 passing yards up to this point (37 on the Packers opening drive), he led the Packers down the field to tie the game at 20–20 with two minutes to play. The Packers started overtime with the ball, and Aaron Jones capped off the comeback win with a 20-yard touchdown run. Hundley would finish the game with 84 passing yards, and the Packers improved to 6–6.

Week 14: at Cleveland Browns

The Packers were trailing the winless Cleveland Browns 14–7 in the third quarter. The Browns scored a touchdown to make it 21–7, but Hundley and the Packers responded with a touchdown drive of their own, making it 21–14. The Packers tied the game with 17 seconds left on a touchdown pass to Davante Adams. In overtime, Browns quarterback DeShone Kizer threw a costly interception to Josh Jones, and Adams took a screen pass to the end zone, improving the Packers record to 7–6 and setting the stage for Aaron Rodgers' comeback.

Week 15: at Carolina Panthers

Aaron Rodgers returned to the field for the first time since being injured in Week 6. His three touchdowns, however, were negated by his three interceptions as the Panthers won 31–24 by a forced fumble in the game's final minute. With Atlanta beating Tampa Bay the next day, the Green Bay Packers were eliminated from the playoffs for the first time since 2008.

Despite the return of Rodgers, he had little on-field impact.  He threw 3 touchdown passes, but he was also picked off 3 times and got sacked 3 times in the loss.

Week 16: vs. Minnesota Vikings

This Christmas edition of Sunday Night Football was anticipated to be a critical NFC North game before the season, however, with Aaron Rodgers back on IR and the Packers eliminated, the game did not live up to such standards.

The Vikings played conservatively all night, and like the Ravens, won the game with expert field position and forced Brett Hundley to make mistakes. He threw two interceptions to Harrison Smith. The Packers were shut out twice at home in the same season for the first time since 2006, and their record dropped to 7–8.

Week 17: at Detroit Lions

With a final score of 11–35 in a blowout loss, the Packers were swept by the Lions for the first time since 1991. Green Bay lost 3 straight games to close out a miserable season. The loss all but sealed the team's first losing season since 2008, with a disappointing 7–9 record.

Standings

Division

Conference

Statistics

Statistical leaders

League rankings

Awards

References

External links

Green Bay
Green Bay Packers seasons
Green Bay Packers